The Black Tulip is a 1921 Dutch silent adventure film directed by Maurits Binger. It is based  on the novel The Black Tulip by Alexandre Dumas.

Cast
 Gerald McCarthy - Cornelis van Baerle
 Zoe Palmer - Rosa, daughter of the jailer
 Eduard Verkade - Cornelis de Witt
 Dio Huysmans - Johan de Witt
 Coen Hissink - Jailer / Gryphus
 Harry Waghalter - Isaac Boxtel
 August Van den Hoeck - Tichelaer, the barber from Piershil
 Frank Dane - Prins van Oranje
 Lau Ezerman - Willem
 Wilhelmina van den Hoeck - Wife of Cornelis de Witt
 Josephine Homann-Niehorster
 Carl Tobi
 Fred Homann
 Betty Doxat-Pratt

External links 
 

1921 films
Dutch black-and-white films
1920s historical adventure films
Films directed by Maurits Binger
Dutch silent feature films
Dutch historical adventure films
Films set in the 1670s
Films based on French novels
Films based on works by Alexandre Dumas
Silent historical adventure films